Concordville Historic District is a national historic district located at Concordville, Delaware County, Pennsylvania.  The district includes six contributing buildings in Concordville. Four of the buildings are the Newlin Tenant House, Concord Orthodox Meeting, Samuel Trimble House, and 1856 Brick House.  The two remaining buildings are separately listed on the National Register; the Concord Friends Meetinghouse and Nicholas Newlin House.

It was added to the National Register of Historic Places in 1973.

References

Historic districts on the National Register of Historic Places in Pennsylvania
Historic districts in Delaware County, Pennsylvania
National Register of Historic Places in Delaware County, Pennsylvania